Ice Field is a musical composition by Henry Brant, for large orchestral groups and organ, commissioned by Other Minds for a December 2001 premiere by the San Francisco Symphony. It was awarded the 2002 Pulitzer Prize for Music, and premiered on December 12 at Davies Symphony Hall in San Francisco. A, "'spatial narrative,'" or, "spatial organ concerto," and thus an example of Brant's use of spatialization, the work utilizes more than 100 players.

The piece was, "inspired by his experience, as a 12-year-old in 1926, of crossing the Atlantic by ship, which navigated carefully through a large field of icebergs in the North Atlantic."

Sources

Compositions by Henry Brant
Music for orchestra and organ
Pulitzer Prize for Music-winning works
2001 compositions
Spatial music